Shevchenko is the name of several rural localities in Russia:
Shevchenko, Republic of Adygea, a khutor in Teuchezhsky District of the Republic of Adygea
Shevchenko, Kursk Oblast, a khutor in Sovetsky District of Kursk Oblast
Shevchenko, name of several other rural localities